Nebuchadnezzar is a city-building game developed and published by Nepos Games for Windows and Linux on December 3, 2020. The game takes place in the Ancient Mesopotamia. The game has been compared to Impressions Games' City Building series, especially the fourth entry, Pharaoh.

Gameplay
The game's campaign tasks the player with building some of the cities in ancient Mesopotamia like Ur, Nineveh, and Babylon.

Release
Nebuchadnezzar was announced on November 2, 2019, for release in 2020. On November 19, 2020, the game was delayed to February 17, 2021. A DLC campaign, The Adventures of Sargon, was released on February 7, 2023.

Reception

Nebuchadnezzar received "mixed or average" reviews according to review aggregator Metacritic.

Rick Lane of PC Gamer summarized: "I like a lot of what Nebuchadnezzar does, from its wonderful presentation to its highly dynamic city simulation. But the core systems are currently too stern and austere compared to the payoff of successfully building your city. Similar games like Anno 1800 and Dyson Sphere Program offer grander, more spectacular rewards with fewer frustrations. Nebuchadnezzar isn't lacking for class, but needs to dial up the fun factor."

Nate Crowley of Rock Paper Shotgun criticized the lack of content: "There are temples, but there's no religion. There's no entertainment. No war. No disease. No taxes, even. Admittedly, there's no fire or crime either, and I do not miss the requirement to spam otherwise purposeless buildings in order to prevent constant, petty disasters. But overall, it makes you even more glad you've got your monuments to customise, because other than that, it's just warehouse planning all the way down."

Matt Wales of Eurogamer described the campaign: "Then there's the inherent repetition of each campaign mission, requiring players to cover the same old steps plus a bit more each time to reach their goal. For me though, that's part of the charm, and I've struggled to wrench myself free of Nebuchadnezzar's soothingly familiar cycles and logistical tinkering this week, happily losing hours to its gentle rhythm of expansion."

At the 2021 Czech Game of the Year Awards, Nebuchadnezzar won the Best Technological Solution award.

References

External links

2021 video games
Ancient Mesopotamia in popular culture
City-building games
Indie video games
Linux games
Single-player video games
Video games developed in the Czech Republic
Video games with downloadable content
Video games with Steam Workshop support
Windows games